The Southern African Clothing and Textile Workers' Union (SACTWU) is the biggest union in the South African clothing, textile, footwear and leather industry, with more than 100 000 members. It negotiates wages for the vast majority of workers in these industries in South Africa, with the collective bargaining agreements covering over 150 000 workers.

SACTWU is the sixth largest affiliate of the Congress of South African Trade Unions (COSATU). The union was born through the merger of the Amalgamated Clothing and Textile Workers' Union of South Africa and the Garment and Allied Workers' Union of South Africa, on 16 September 1989.

Leadership

General Secretaries
Jabu Ngcobo
1999: Ebrahim Patel
2009: Andre Kriel

Presidents
1989: Amon Ntuli
2003: Themba Khumalo

Trade unions in South Africa
Congress of South African Trade Unions
Textile and clothing trade unions
Trade unions established in 1989